Gentlea is a genus of plant in family Primulaceae. It contains the following species (but this list may be incomplete):
 Gentlea molinae Lundell
 Gentlea vatteri (Standley & Steyerm.) Lundell

 
Primulaceae genera
Taxonomy articles created by Polbot